General William Anson McCleverty (11 February 1806 – 6 October 1897) was a British soldier who served as the Commander-in-chief of the Madras Army from 1867 to 1871.

Early life 
Born the son of Major-General Robert McCleverty, McCleverty was commissioned in the 48th Regiment of Foot in 1824.

Military career 

McCleverty served in campaigns against the Maharajah of Coorg (1834) and in New Zealand during the Wanganui Campaign (1847). He lived in New Zealand from 1846 to 1857, and later returned to New Zealand for another period. Promoted to major-general, he became commander of Madras district in 1860, General Officer Commanding South-Eastern District in October 1866 and Commander-in-Chief of the Madras Army in November 1867 before retiring from that post in March 1871. 

From 1868 to 1875 he held the colonelcy of the 108th (Madras Infantry) Regiment of Foot from which he transferred as colonel in 1875 to the 48th (Northamptonshire) Regiment of Foot, continuing on its amalgamation in 1881 as colonel of the 1st Battalion of the resultant Northamptonshire Regiment, a position he held until his death. He was promoted full General on 17 March 1876.

McCleverty died on 6 October 1897 at the age of ninety-one.

Art 
McCleverty painted in watercolours and several of his works are held by the Alexander Turnbull Library in Wellington and the National Library of Australia in Canberra.

References 

|-
 

1806 births
1897 deaths
Commanders-in-chief of Madras
Members of the Madras Legislative Council
48th Regiment of Foot officers
Military leaders of the New Zealand Wars
British Army generals
Members of the New Zealand Legislative Council (1841–1853)